Aldona Jonaitis is the director of the University of Alaska Museum of the North, a professor of anthropology at the University of Alaska Fairbanks, and an author who has published widely on Native American art.

From 1975 to 1989, Jonaitis was a faculty member and administrator at the State University at Stony Brook. Then from 1989 to 1993 she was the vice president for public programs at the American Museum of Natural History. She is currently the director of the University of Alaska Museum of the North in Fairbanks, Alaska.

Books
 From the Land of the Totem Poles (1986)
 Art of the Northern Tlingit (1986)
 Chiefly Feasts: The Enduring Kwakiutl Potlatch (1991)
 Art of the Northwest Coast (2006)
 The Yuquot Whalers' Shrine  (1999)
 Looking North : Art from the University of Alaska Museum (1998)
 Robert Davidson: Eagle of the Dawn (1993)
 The Yuquot Whalers' Shrine (1999)
 Tlingit halibut hooks: An analysis of the visual symbols of a rite of passage (1981)

References

External links
 full text of The Yuquot Whalers' Shrine online

Year of birth missing (living people)
American women non-fiction writers
Writers from Fairbanks, Alaska
Living people
University of Alaska Fairbanks faculty
Stony Brook University faculty
People associated with the American Museum of Natural History
American women anthropologists
American anthropologists
American women academics
21st-century American women